Officers Club, Dhaka is a government officers club in Dhaka, Bangladesh. Mesbah Uddin, additional Secretary of Local Government Division, was elected as General Secretary of the Club in 2019 with the term ending in 2021. The club is described as being "exclusive".

History
The club was founded in 1967. The club membership is restricted to government officers and officers of semi-government or autonomous bodies. The club is managed by an elected executive committee. The committee is elected for a term of two years.

References

1967 establishments in East Pakistan
Clubs and societies in Bangladesh
Organisations based in Dhaka